San Girolamo may refer to:

 San Girolamo, Italian for Saint Jerome
 Marconi-San Girolamo-Fesca, quarter of Bari, region of Apulia, Italy
 San Girolamo, Cremona, a 17th-century, Baroque style, Roman Catholic church in Cremona, region of Lombardy, Italy
 San Girolamo, Reggio Emilia, a Baroque Roman Catholic church in central Reggio Emilia, Italy
 San Girolamo, Cingoli, a Gothic-style, Roman Catholic church of Cingoli, province of Macerata, region of Marche, Italy
 Villa San Girolamo,  building complex in Fiesole, Tuscany, Italy
 San Girolamo in Campansi, former convent of Siena, region of Tuscany, Italy
 San Girolamo a Corviale, church in Rome